Television Malawi (TVM), founded in 1999, is a public broadcaster run by the Malawi Broadcasting Corporation (MBC) in Blantyre, Malawi. The station transmits its signal throughout the country via satellite.
On July 1, 2011, TVM and MBC merged. On February 19, 2013, Television Malawi started broadcasting on Dstv channel 295.

References

Mass media in Malawi
Government of Malawi